"Ngomhla sibuyayo" is a South African anti‐apartheid folk song. The title of the song means "On the day we arrive", alluding to an imminent war against the apartheid regime. An excerpt from the piece is heard at the beginning of the song "Biko" by Peter Gabriel.

References

Songs against racism and xenophobia
South African folk songs
Anti-apartheid songs